Delon Washington (born c. 1976) is a former American football running back. After attending Kimball High School in Dallas, he played for the USC Trojans from 1994 to 1997.  He led the team in rushing in 1995 with 1,109 yards and again in 1997 with 444 yards. Washington was suspended for the first three games of the 1996 season for an undisclosed "ethical violation." During his time at USC, Washington totaled 2,093 rushing yards and scored 12 touchdowns.

References

Living people
American football running backs
USC Trojans football players
Year of birth missing (living people)